Broberg/Söderhamn Bandy is a Swedish bandy club from Söderhamn who play in the Elitserien.  Broberg/Söderhamn, also known as Brobergs IF, was founded on 19 April 1919. Broberg play their home matches at Hällåsen.

Broberg have won the Bandy World Cup 4 times in 1975, 1977, 1978 and 1983.  They have also been runners-up twice in 1974 and 1981. They have also won the Swedish Championship final five times in 1947, 1963, 1964, 1976 and 1977.

History
Broberg/Söderhamn Bandy was founded in 1919.

In December 1979, the club played the first bandy game in the USA, a friendly game against the Swedish junior national team in Edina, Minnesota.

Honours

Domestic
 Swedish Champions:
 Winners (5): 1947, 1963, 1964, 1976, 1977
 Runners-up (5): 1948, 1965, 1966, 1969, 1979

References

External links
Official website
ibdb bandysidan

 
Bandy clubs in Sweden
Sport in Söderhamn
Bandy clubs established in 1919
1919 establishments in Sweden